ADERRA may refer to:

Automobile Dealer Economic Rights Restoration Act, US legislation introduced in the 111th United States Congress to restore the economic rights of car dealers
Aderra inc., a music technology company based in Los Angeles and London